Luis Castro Rodríguez (born 21 May 1980 in A Coruña, Galicia), commonly known as Sito, is a Spanish professional footballer who plays for SD Logroñés as a defender (right or left back).

Football career
After starting professionally with CD Lugo and CD Calahorra, Sito spent three seasons with another Galician club, Racing Club de Ferrol – two in Segunda División and another in Segunda División B. He signed with Ipswich Town on 5 August 2005 on a free transfer, after a trial.

After two years in and out of the first team, Sito enjoyed a good spell in the 2007–08 campaign, following injuries and loss of form to those ahead of him in the pecking order. He scored his only goal for the English side and in the Championship against Scunthorpe United, helping to a 2–1 away win on 22 March 2008; previously, in early January 2006, he had extended his contract with the club until the summer of 2008.

Sito was released by Ipswich in May 2008 and returned to Spain the following month, joining UD Salamanca. His best output consisted of 35 games in his third year (34 starts), but the Charros were relegated from the second level.

References

External links

1980 births
Living people
Spanish footballers
Footballers from A Coruña
Association football defenders
Segunda División players
Segunda División B players
Tercera División players
CD Lugo players
Racing de Ferrol footballers
UD Salamanca players
Peña Sport FC footballers
English Football League players
Ipswich Town F.C. players
Spanish expatriate footballers
Expatriate footballers in England
Spanish expatriate sportspeople in England